Luigi Alberto Scaglia (born 23 November 1986) is an Italian footballer who plays for Serie D club Sporting Franciacorta.

Biography

Brescia & Lumezzane
Born in Chiari, the Province of Brescia, Scaglia spent a few seasons on loan to Lega Pro club Lumezzane, which he played for the club in the second half of 2005–06 Serie C1 season, whole 2006–07 Serie C2 season and whole 2008–09 Lega Pro Prima Divisione season. He also returned to Brescia for 2007–08 Serie B. In 2009–10 Lega Pro Prima Divisione season Lumezzane bought him in a co-ownership deal.

Torino (loan)
In January 2010 Brescia bought back Scaglia from Lumezzane, but loaned him to fellow Serie B team Torino. The team losing some players as they were frighten by the ultras and submitted transfer request. Torino finished as the 5th and entered the promotion playoffs, which losing to Brescia in the finals. Scaglia played the first leg of the finals as starter in its 3-4-2-1 formation, supporting the central forward Rolando Bianchi along with winger Andrea Gasbarroni.

Torino did not excised the option to sign him in a co-ownership deal in June 2010. However, on 31 August the loan was extended.

Cremonese (loan)
On 27 January 2011, the loan was terminated and he was loaned to Lega Pro Prime Division club Cremonese from Brescia.

Return to Brescia (2011–2015)
In summer 2011 Scaglia returned to Brescia, being part of the first team. On 3 July 2013 Scaglia signed a new 2-year contract.

Latina
On 1 July 2015 Scaglia was signed by Latina on a free transfer in a 3-year contract.

Parma
On 31 January 2017 Scaglia was signed by Parma from Latina in a -year contract.

Foggia (loan)
On 12 January 2018, Scaglia was loaned to Serie B team Foggia.

Catania (loan)
On 27 August 2018, he joined Serie C club Catania on loan.

Carrarese (loan)
On 31 January 2019, Scaglia joined Carrarese on loan until 30 June 2019.

Trapani and Sporting Franciacorta
On 23 August 2019, Scaglia joined Trapani for an undisclosed fee. He left Trapani in 2020 to sign for Serie D club Sporting Franciacorta.

References

External links
 Lega Serie B Profile 
 Cremonese Profile 
 Football.it Profile 
 

Living people
1986 births
Sportspeople from the Province of Brescia
Association football wingers
Italian footballers
Brescia Calcio players
F.C. Lumezzane V.G.Z. A.S.D. players
Torino F.C. players
U.S. Cremonese players
Latina Calcio 1932 players
Parma Calcio 1913 players
Calcio Foggia 1920 players
Catania S.S.D. players
Carrarese Calcio players
Trapani Calcio players
Serie B players
Serie C players
Footballers from Lombardy